Positive economics (as opposed to normative economics) is the part of economics that deals with positive statements. That is, it focuses on the description, quantification and explanation of economic phenomena.  It deals with empirical facts as well as cause-and-effect behavioral relationships and emphasizes that economic theories<ref>Richard G. Lipsey (2008). "positive economics." The New Palgrave Dictionary of Economics. Second Edition. Abstract.</ref> must be consistent with existing observations and produce testable, precise predictions about the phenomena under question.  Positive economics as a science concerns analysis of economic behavior to determine what is true.  Examples of positive economic statements are "the unemployment rate in France is higher than that in the United States," or  “an increase in government spending would lower the unemployment rate.” Either of these is potentially falsifiable and may be contradicted by evidence. Positive economics as such avoids economic value judgments. For example, a positive economic theory might describe how money supply growth affects inflation, but it does not provide any instruction on what policy ought to be followed. This contrasts with normative economic statements, in which an opinion is given. For example, “Government spending should be increased” is a normative statement.

Definitions

The scientific or positive aspects of economics were emphasized by many 20th century economists in order to show that economic theories could answer questions with the same scientific methodology as the physical sciences.

John Neville Keynes's The Scope and Method of Political Economy defined positive economics as the science of "what is" as compared to normative economics, the study of "what ought to be". Keynes was not the first person to make these distinction between positive and normative economics but his definitions have become the standard in economics teaching.

Lionel Robbins's 1932 book An Essay on the Nature and Significance of Economic Science stated that economics should take as its subject matter attempts by individuals to achieve ends with limited resources. Given that any end was "dependent on scarce means", it should not take a point of view on which ends should or should not be pursued. It is believed that Robbins was instrumental in promoting the fact-value distinction in economics and insisting that ethical or value judgments should not be a part of the discipline, however Robbins' views on this subject were not entirely clear.

Paul Samuelson's Foundations of Economic Analysis (1947) lays out the standard of operationally meaningful theorems through positive economics. Positive economics is commonly deemed necessary for the ranking of economic policies or outcomes as to acceptability.

Milton Friedman, in an influential 1953 essay, elaborated on the distinctions between positive and normative economics. He defined the aim of positive economics as developing theories that give “valid and meaningful” predictions which are precise, testable and in accordance with the available empirical evidence. To do this, economists must create a model that simplifies reality.

Friedman also emphasized that positive and normative economics could never be entirely separated because of their relationship with economic policy.  Disagreements about economic policy are primarily due to an inability to agree about the likely consequences of a piece of legislation. As economics developed, Friedman believed that it would become increasingly possible to derive undisputed results about positive economic statements and that this would help to make clear judgments about the best ways to achieve normative goals such as minimum wage legislature.

Philosophy

The methodological basis for positive/normative distinctions is rooted in the fact-value distinction in philosophy. The principal proponents of such distinctions originate with David Hume and G. E. Moore. Hulme defined a 'matter of fact' as something that could be directly perceived with one of the five senses. However, current positivist science now poses facts that cannot be verified in this manner. John Stuart Mill made use of Hulme's fact-value distinction to define the science and art of economics in A System of Logic.

The logical basis of such a relation as a dichotomy has been disputed in philosophical literature. Such debates are reflected in discussion of positive science.

Criticism

Since its inception as a discipline, economics has been criticized for failing to adequately separate its scientific and non-scientific aspects.

Critics such as Gunnar Myrdal (1954) and proponents of Feminist Economics such as Julie A. Nelson, Geoff Schneider and Jean Shackelford, and Diana Strassmann dispute the idea that economics can be completely neutral and agenda-free.

Nelson argues that many of the current failings of economics are a result of it not being objective enough. Rather than being value-free, many of its perspectives on "subject, model, method and pedagogy" are bound up in a "masculine-gendered" approach.

Schnedier and Shackelford in Ten Principles of Feminist Economics take issue with the definition of economics as a value-free, positive science. They propose that values play a role in all levels of economic analysis and that the types of questions that economists choose to investigate are influenced by ideological systems. For example, the statement "A country's standard of living depends on its ability to produce goods and services" relies on the ideologically-motivated assumption that GDP per capita is the most useful indicator of standard of living.

Hilary Putnam has also criticized the very foundation of the positive/normative dichotomy from a linguistic perspective, arguing that it is not possible to separate "value judgments from statements of facts".

 See also 
 Consumer theory
 Distribution (economics) 
 Economic methodology
 Feminist economics
 Normative economics
 Philosophy of economics
 Production possibilities frontier
 Supply and demand

Notes

 References 
 Andrew Caplin and Andrew Schotte, ed. (2008). The Foundations of Positive and Normative Economics: A Handbook,  Oxford. Description and preview.
 Milton Friedman (1953). "The Methodology of Positive Economics," Essays in Positive Economics.
 Daniel M. Hausman and Michael S. McPherson (1996). Economic Analysis and Moral Philosophy, "Appendix: How could ethics matter to economics?", pp. 211–20:
A.2:  Objection 2: Positive economics is value-free
A.3: How positive economics involves morality
 John Neville Keynes (1891). The Scope and Method of Political Economy
 Richard G. Lipsey (2008). "positive economics." The New Palgrave Dictionary of Economics. Second Edition. Abstract.
  Gunnar Myrdal (1954 [1929]). The Political Element in the Development of Economic Theory, trans. Paul Streeten (Cambridge, MA: Harvard University Press).
 Lionel Robbins (1932). An Essay on the Nature and Significance of Economic Science.
 Paul A. Samuelson (1947, Enlarged ed. 1983). Foundations of Economic Analysis
 Stanley Wong (1987). “positive economics," The New Palgrave: A Dictionary of Economics, v. 3, pp. 920–21.

External links
 Essays in Positive Economics by Milton Friedman
 Milton Friedman ([1953] 1966). "The Methodology of Positive Economics," excerpts from Friedman's essay

Economic methodology